The entropy of entanglement (or entanglement entropy) is a measure of the degree of quantum entanglement between two subsystems constituting a two-part composite quantum system. Given a pure bipartite quantum state of the composite system, it is possible to obtain a reduced density matrix describing knowledge of the state of a subsystem. The entropy of entanglement is the Von Neumann entropy of the reduced density matrix for any of the subsystems. If it is non-zero, i.e. the subsystem is in a mixed state, it indicates the two subsystems are entangled.

More mathematically; if a state describing two subsystems A and B is a separable state, then the reduced density matrix is a pure state.  Thus, the  entropy of the state is zero. Similarly, the density matrix of B would also have 0 entropy.  A reduced density matrix having a non-zero entropy is therefore a signal of the existence of entanglement in the system.

Bipartite entanglement entropy
Suppose that a quantum system consists of particles. Bipartite entanglement entropy is defined with respect to this bipartition.

Von Neumann entanglement entropy
The bipartite von Neumann entanglement entropy  is defined as the von Neumann entropy of either of its reduced states, since they are of the same value (can be proved from Schmidt decomposition of the state with respect to the bipartition); the result is independent of which one we pick. That is, for a pure state , it is given by:

The entanglement entropy can be expressed using the singular values of the Schmidt decomposition of the state. The entropy of entanglement is simply:

Many entanglement measures reduce to the entropy of entanglement when evaluated on pure states. Among those are:

Distillable entanglement
Entanglement cost
Entanglement of formation
Relative entropy of entanglement
Squashed entanglement

Some entanglement measures that do not reduce to the entropy of entanglement are:

Negativity
Logarithmic negativity
Robustness of entanglement

Renyi entanglement entropies
The Renyi entanglement entropies  are also defined in terms of the reduced density matrices, and a Renyi index .  It is defined as the Rényi entropy of the reduced density matrices:

Note that in the limit , The Renyi entanglement entropy approaches the Von Neumann entanglement entropy.

Example with coupled harmonic oscillators 

Then 

The Von Neumann Entropy is thus

.

Similarly the Renyi entropy .

Area law of bipartite entanglement entropy
A quantum state satisfies an area law if the leading term of the entanglement entropy grows at most proportionally with the boundary between the two partitions.
Area laws are remarkably common for ground states of local gapped quantum many-body systems.  This has important applications, one such application being that it greatly reduces the complexity of quantum many-body systems.  The density matrix renormalization group and matrix product states, for example, implicitly rely on such area laws.

References/sources

Entropy